João Miguel Fins Veloso (born 26 June 2005) is a Portuguese professional footballer who plays as a midfielder for the Benfica U19s.

Professional career
Veloso is a youth product of CB Loulé, CB Albufeira and Benfica. On 18 June 2022, he signed his first professional contract with Benfica. In September 2022, he was named by English newspaper The Guardian as one of the best players born in 2005 worldwide.

International career
Veloso is a youth international for Portugal, having played with the Portugal U16s, U17s, and U18s.

Playing style
Veloso is a complete midfielder, with tactical intelligence and strength. He is skilled at maintaining the team's tempo, starts attacking tempo, and can also finish well.

References

External links
 
 

2005 births
Living people
People from Albufeira
Portuguese footballers
Portugal youth international footballers
Association football midfielders
S.L. Benfica footballers